The 1992 Segunda División B play-offs were the final playoffs for the promotion from 1991–92 Segunda División B to 1992–93 Segunda División. The first four teams in each group took part in the play-off. The teams played a league of four teams, divided into 4 groups. The champion of each group promoted to Segunda División.

Group A

Results

Group B

Results

Group C

Results

Group D

Results

Segunda División B play-offs
1992 Spanish football leagues play-offs